Choi Yeong-bae (born 9 November 1938) is a South Korean speed skater. He competed at the 1960 Winter Olympics and the 1964 Winter Olympics.

References

1938 births
Living people
South Korean male speed skaters
Olympic speed skaters of South Korea
Speed skaters at the 1960 Winter Olympics
Speed skaters at the 1964 Winter Olympics
Speed skaters from Seoul